Creosote bush scrub is a North American desert vegetation type (or biome) of sparsely but evenly spaced desert plants dominated by creosote bush (Larrea tridentata) and its associates.  Its visual characterization is of widely spaced shrubs that are somewhat evenly distributed over flat or relatively flat desert areas that receive between 2 and 8 inches of rain each year.  It covers the majority of the flat desert floor and relatively flat alluvial fans in the Mojave Desert, Chihuahuan Desert, and Sonoran Desert. The dominant plants that typify this vegetation type are creosote bush (Larrea tridentata) and its associates, white bur-sage (Ambrosia dumosa), brittlebush (Encelia farinosa, Encelia actoni, Encelia virginensis), cheese-bush (Ambrosia salsola), Mojave yucca (Yucca schidigera), silver cholla cactus (Cylindropuntia echinocarpa), and beavertail cactus (Opuntia basilaris).  Creosote bush has a wider range than its associates, so codominant shrubs, which are associated with more narrow ranges, will vary from region to region.

References
 

Deserts and xeric shrublands
Flora of the Southwestern United States